Hugh Lincoln Cooper (April 28, 1865–June 24, 1937) was an American colonel and civil engineer, known for construction supervision of a number of hydroelectric power plants.

Biography

Born in Houston County in Sheldon, Minnesota, Cooper was a self-educated civil engineer. He worked throughout the United States, Canada, Brazil, Egypt, and Soviet Union. During World War I he served as a supervising engineer in the US Army Corps of Engineers.

Cooper died in Stamford, Connecticut in 1937.

Supervised constructions 

 Toronto Power Generating Station, Niagara Falls, Ontario, Canada (1906)
 Keokuk Dam, Hamilton, Illinois and Keokuk, Iowa (1910-1913)
 Wilson Dam, Shoals Shore, Alabama (1918-1924)
 Lake Zumbro Hydroelectric Generating Plant, Mazeppa, Minnesota (1919)
 Dniprohes, Soviet Union (now Zaporizhzhia, Ukraine) (1927-1932) — upon completion of the project, Hugh Cooper was awarded Order of the Red Banner of Labour

References

External links 
 Hugh Lincoln Cooper at the American Society of Civil Engineers website.
 M. Bourke-White, Image of Col. Hugh L. Cooper supervising the building of the great dam across the Dineper River. Life Magazine, 1931.
 Hugh L. Cooper speaks to MIT civil engineers, January 1915.
 

1865 births
1937 deaths
People from Houston County, Minnesota
Military personnel from Minnesota
American civil engineers
American expatriates in the Soviet Union
United States Army officers
Recipients of the Order of the Red Banner of Labour